Despoina Theodoridou (born 25 May 1978) is a Greek former synchronized swimmer.

Despoina competed in the women's duet at the 2000 Summer Olympics with Christina Thalassinidou and finished in thirteenth place.

References 

1978 births
Living people
Greek synchronized swimmers
Olympic synchronized swimmers of Greece
Synchronized swimmers at the 2000 Summer Olympics
Sportspeople from Serres
20th-century Greek women
21st-century Greek women